Secret Story - Casa dos Segredos 4 is the fourth season of the Portuguese reality television show Secret Story. It is based on the French version of Secret Story, which itself is based on the international format, Big Brother. All episodes will be broadcast on TVI. It started on 29 September.

The opening gala coincided with televised broadcasts of the results of the just-ended local government election. Despite being one of the most highly contested local government elections, with near-record voter turnout, The show enjoyed an impressive 27% audience share, 1.7 million viewers.

Housemates

Aníbal 
Aníbal Borges is 37 and is from Alenquer. He is the operational manager of a chemical company. He is the twin brother of an ex-housemate from Big Brother 1, Marco Borges. He wants to enter in Secret Story, to end being known for being Marco's twin brother. It is a man who lives in the moment as if there were no tomorrow. He entered on Day 1 and left on Day 15.

 Nominations faced: 1 nomination
 Secret: "I have stolen to eat"
 Status: Evicted on Day 15 - 90%

Bernardina 
Bernardina Brito is 20 and comes from Paços de Brandão, municipality of Santa Maria da Feira. In child had a dream to be mechanical, like his idol, the godfather. She likes to be the center of attention. When she can, she sings and simulates being on a stage. Comes from a close-knit family. They are always together at all times. She entered on Day 1.

 Nominations faced: 4 nominations
 Secret: "We are fake enemies" (with Joana)
 Status: Evicted on Day 85 - 10% (to save)

Bruno 
Bruno Nunes is 23 and comes from Amadora. He is a student of Business Administration. He is a perfectionist in everything he does and controls everything that surrounds him. He is a natural-born player and at the casino can hit nine out of ten plays in French banking. When provoked, reacts with intelligent discourse to ridicule the enemy. He entered on Day 1 and left on Day 61.

 Nominations faced: 4 nominations
 Secret: "I am the heir of a big fortune"
 Status: Walked on Day 61

Débora 
Débora Picoito is 19, is a model and comes from Fuseta, Algarve. She recently completed the 12th grade and she no longer thinks to study more, because she wants to be an air hostess. She loves to go out at night, despite being afraid of the dark. She never sleeps alone because of this phobia. She is very demanding with their boyfriends. Coincidentally, all the boyfriends that had until now, belonged to the Sporting squad. She entered on Day 1 and left on Day 64.

 Nominations faced: 1 nomination
 Secret: "I am a victim of identity theft on the Internet"
 Status: Evicted on Day 64 - 72%

Diana 
Diana Ferreira is 20 and comes from Vila Real, Trás-os-Montes. She studies law at the University of Coimbra and wants to end with the idea that the Secret Story housemate have a little general knowledge. She admires Fernando Pessoa, for being a mix of personalities in a single human. She likes three things in fame: power, extravagance and luxury. She entered on Day 1 and left on Day 50.

 Nominations faced: 2 nominations
 Secret: "I was chosen by a housemate"
 Status: Evicted on Day 50 - 54%

Diogo 
Diogo Marcelino is 24 and comes from Sesimbra. He already was the rack, commercial and barman. Now works in his father's business, in real estate. He likes activities related to the sea. He has fun catching seafood and diving. He is 1.95m tall and does not go unnoticed in nightclubs. He had several girlfriends but has trouble being faithful. If he would a superhero, he would be the fireman, to let women's hearts aflame. He entered on Day 1.

 Nominations faced: 3 nominations
 Secret: "I have suffered an attack of myocardial"
 Status: 3rd Finalist - 12%

Érica 
Érica Silva is 24 and comes from Ribeira Brava, Madeira, where she is a hairdresser. She likes to come to the mainland, especially in summer, because the night is busier. She is not the woman of serious relationships, but friendships colored. She knows many famous football players, musicians and actors. She is proud of herself and says that she has a knack for send in others. She entered on Day 1.

 Nominations faced: 3 nominations
 Secret: "I have a list of all the people that I had sex with"
 Status: 4th Finalist - 8%

Joana 
Joana Diniz is 20 and comes from Vila Franca de Xira. She is a dancer of high competition. She was the national champion of ballroom dancing and represents Portugal in various international competitions. Once a week helps her mother, who is fishwife. She is single and says she is happy. She never suffered for love. She likes a man with a good body and humility. She entered on Day 1.

 Nominations faced: 1 nomination
 Secret: "We are fake enemies" (with Bernardina)
 Status: 5th Finalist - 3%

João 
João Paulo Sousa is 24 and comes from Matosinhos. He is a barman in Oporto. He enjoys it and says that it is the only way to achieve success. He is a boy applied and is dedicates 100 percent to all the challenges he faces. He doesn't have a girlfriend. He likes brunette women, but the girl that he more likes is his daughter. He entered on Day 1 and left on Day 57.

 Nominations faced: 2 nominations
 Secret: "I am the infiltrator of A Voz"
 Status: Evicted on Day 57 - 58%

Juliana 
Juliana Dias is 24 and comes from Trofa. She took the course of traditional Chinese medicine, but she is a make-up artist and also does work as a dancer for popular singers. She likes to be associated with a 'barbie' for having produced such a picture. She says that in another life she has been a Marilyn Monroe, being a woman of desire, sensuality and extreme beauty. She is super energetic and chafes at slow people. She entered on Day 1 and left on Day 36.

 Nominations faced: 3 nominations
 Secret: "I hear voices in my head"
 Status: Evicted on Day 36 - 56%

Lourenço 
Lourenço Cunha is 31 and comes from Luxembourg, but would like to return to Portugal. He recently ended a relationship of nine years. He has a daughter, the fruit of this union. In his leisure enjoys writing novels, but only write for himself. He does not like to follow the herd and prefers to be the pack leader. He entered on Day 1 and left on Day 43.

 Nominations faced: 1 nomination
 Secret: "I changed gender this year"
 Status: Evicted on Day 43 - 70%

Luís 
Luís Nascimento is 24 and loves Portuguese popular music and does not lose the opportunity of giving a little foot dance. He comes from Elvas and is an assistant surveyor. He is very emotional and cries easily. His national hero is Liliane Marise. He ensures that he has dated with all the girls in his area. His trick is a simple white shirt. It is infallible with the Portuguese women's and leaves the Spanish women's crazy. He entered on Day 1.

 Nominations faced: 0 nominations
 Secret: "I am the brother of a famous person"
 Status: Winner - 47%

Maria Joana 
Maria Joana Krappen is 22 and comes from Lisbon. She believes in energies and karma. She enjoys being around people, but not to depend on them, so she rejects being arrested in relationships. She is addicted to the mobile phone and the internet. She only gives to others what she receives and has always an answer on the tip of the tongue. She entered on Day 1.

 Nominations faced: 1 nomination
 Secret: "I am descendant of aristocrats"
 Status: Evicted on Day 71 - 60%

Pedro 
Pedro Silva is 22 and comes from Vilamoura. He is a personal trainer, a receptionist in a gym and lifeguard at the Falesia beach. He has a twin brother and says that he is the most rebellious of the two. He likes the crazy, animation and glamor of evenings. He always gets what he wants and effortlessly. If he had to define himself with a word, it would be unique. He entered on Day 8 and left on Day 29.

 Nominations faced: 1 nomination
 Secret: "I have saved two people's lives"
 Status: Evicted on Day 29 - 54%

Rúben 
Rúben Nave is 21 and comes from Belmonte. He has a great success among women. They are his biggest addiction. He has 3 girlfriends. If he would be an animal, he would be a dolphin, be very dear and cuddly and because women love to touch them. He has fixed ideas, very stubborn and always follows his heart. He wants to enter the House to show the strength of the central zone. He entered on Day 1.

 Nominations faced: 5 nominations
 Secret: "I participate in swing"
 Status: Evicted on Day 78 - 61%

Rute 
Rute Freitas is 37 and comes from Setúbal. She is currently unemployed. With her participation in Secret Story, she wants to give a better future to her daughter. She has already worked as a saleswoman, assistant hairdresser, auxiliary childhood and has walked in picking the earthworm and the harvest. She considers herself a fighter. She dates a younger man and she does not miss a good party. She entered on Day 8 and left on Day 22.

 Nominations faced: 1 nomination
 Secret: "I was tortured by my mother"
 Status: Evicted on Day 22 - 61%

Sofia 
Sofia Sousa is 24 and comes from Barreiro. She is a barmaid in a nightclub on the southern shore. She rejects provocations. She does not like to lose. She considers herself a sincere woman, friendly and funny. If she would be a superhero, she would be Catwoman, because besides being a hero is super sexy. She entered on Day 1.

 Nominations faced: 1 nomination
 Secret: "We have a daughter in common" (with Tierry)
 Status: Runner-Up - 30%

Tiago 
Tiago Ginga is 23 and comes from Almada. He would like to be political but is unemployed. His life turns around women. He admires Zé-Zé Camarinha for being the best of seducers. If he was an animal, he would be a lion, because he is the king of the jungle, and the lionesses hunt for him. He entered on Day 1.

 Nominations faced: 1 nomination
 Secret: "My mother predicts the future"
 Status: Evicted on Day 85 - 10% (to save)

Tierry 
Tierry Vilson is 23 and comes from Praia Grande, Sintra. He is an international model. He spends hours in the gym and has great care in maintaining a healthy mind and a healthy body. He practices capoeira and is accomplished to turn somersaults. He is very competitive and does not like losing. He likes that people talk about him, no matter what. He entered on Day 1 and left on Day 37.

 Nominations faced: 0 nominations
 Secret: "We have a daughter in common" (with Sofia)
 Status: Walked on Day 37

Yana 
Yana Protasova is 22 and lives in Campo Maior. She was born on Ukraine, but came to Portugal at age 14 and had to adapt to a completely different culture. She considers herself a difficult person to put up with. Recently she finished her degree in fashion design and wants to find a job in Lisbon. She wants to end with the prejudice that still exists toward people of eastern countries. She entered on Day 1 and left on Day 8.

 Nominations faced: 1 nomination
 Secret: "I never met my father"
 Status: Evicted on Day 8 - 39%

Secrets 
There are 18 secrets in the House for the fourth season.
Housemates could only start pressing the red button on Monday (7 October), because new housemates entered on Sunday (6 October).

Nominations Table 
Nominations follow a different formula than its typical of the Big Brother franchise. Each week the housemates alternate nominations: male housemates nominate female housemates one week, and female housemates nominate male housemates the following week. Also, during some weeks, twist occur which affect the nomination procedure.

Notes

Nominations total received

Nominations: Results

Twists

Houseguests 
There were some houseguests on this season, from potential housemates to familiars/friends of the housemates.

Fake nominations 
On Day 45, Each boys had to fake nominate a girl. They couldn't nominate Bernardina and Érica, as they were immune. They couldn't also nominate Diana, as she was already nominated since Sunday. Débora would be nominated if it was real.

On Day 80, Teresa announced a fake eviction later on the night. Housemates nominated in two rounds. All housemates could nominate and be nominated. In round 2, there was a tie between Sofia, Bernardina and Diogo. In the tie-breaker, they all made the same nomination, exempt Érica, who nominated Bernardina. Érica and Bernardina were fake nominated, and Bernardina was fake evicted later.

Finalist vote 
On Day 71, before the eviction, the housemates had to vote for someone to win a pass to the finale. There was a tie then between Joana, Luís and Diogo. The housemates had to vote between them. Joana got the most votes in the tie-breaker round, therefore she is the finalist.

Ratings and Reception

Live Eviction Shows 
The Live Eviction show will air every Sunday.

Nominations Shows 
Housemates' nominations will be broadcast live every Tuesday.

References

External links 
 Official Website 

04
2013 Portuguese television seasons